The 1944 Coronado Amphibious Training Base football team was an American football team that represented the United States Navy's Amphibious Training Base at Coronado, California. The base was commissioned in January 1944. The team compiled a 2–1–1 record.

The team was coached by Al Nichelini, a former star at St. Mary's College who played two seasons in the NFL. Players included: Fred Naumetz, later an All-Pro center for the Los Angeles Rams; Ray King, an end who played for Minnesota; Bill Murphy, a back who played for Cornell; and E.F. Corrido, who played for Oklahoma.

Schedule

References

San Diego Naval Training Station
San Diego Naval Training Station Bluejackets football